Le Secret du Lone Star is a 1920 French silent film directed by Jacques de Baroncelli.

Cast
Fannie Ward   
Gabriel Signoret   
Henri Gouget   
Henri Janvier   
Rex McDougall

External links 

1920 films
French silent films
French black-and-white films
Films directed by Jacques de Baroncelli
French drama films
Silent drama films